Ulead PhotoImpact (originally called Iedit) is a raster and vector graphics editing program published by Ulead Systems.

Alongside its image editing capabilities, the program also features HTML tools, such as a rollover assistant, an imagemap assistant, an HTML assistant, a background designer and a button library. PhotoImpact can also use photoshop filters in .8bf format.

PhotoImpact has vast support for graphic file formats but also uses its own UFO and UFP file format which support all the aforementioned features. 

The last version of PhotoImpact was X3/13.

In December 2006 Corel acquired Ulead Systems.  Corel continued to market PhotoImpact until September 2009 when they discontinued the product, focusing on the competing product Paint Shop Pro.  Though development has been halted, the product is still being sold by Corel. A version of PhotoImpact licensed as PhotoImpact Pro is sold by Nova Development.  It is a rebranded version of PhotoImpact with no program differences.  However, while the Ulead and Corel specs omit Windows 7, the Nova specs in 2014 mention that Windows 7 and Windows 8.x are supported.

For users, there are various help forums and tutorial banks available, both factory and non-factory.

Release history

References

External links
Corel PhotoImpact page: X3
Nova Development PhotoImpact pages: Pro 13
Ulead PhotoImpact page: 
VK.COM Group

Ulead software
Photo software
Windows graphics-related software
Proprietary software